The Toronto Marathon, held annually on the first Sunday of May, is a race from Yonge and Sheppard, in the north end of Toronto, to Exhibition Place, via Humber Bay Park. The origins of the event trace back to 1977, and the race was initially called the Canadian International Marathon. In 2003, its name was changed to the Toronto Marathon. It was held previously on the third Sunday in October, the first Sunday after Canadian Thanksgiving, for 16 consecutive years. Because of concerns that another event was being held three weeks prior and led to too many road closures, as well as pressure from a major financial institution, the Toronto Marathon was moved to the first Sunday of May in 2012.  The event was temporarily held mid-May in 2011, due to other events in the City of Toronto that year. 

In addition to a full marathon, the event also includes a half marathon, a 10K run, a 5K run, and an eight-person relay across the marathon course. The marathon meets international standards and is a qualifier for the Boston Marathon. The event is a member of AIMs and Athletics Ontario and meets their criteria.

The race featured women marathoners prior to the opening of the Olympic competition for the women. In 1984, Anne Hird won the race as winds gusted and a large field pursued her. In 1988, the winner was Susan Stone, who had just become the Canadian National Champion in the 10K two weeks prior to the race.

Regularly attracting 8,000 to 10,000 participants from over 55 countries, and every Province and Territory in Canada, the event is also a major fundraiser for many charities. A Runners Expo is held on the Friday and Saturday at the Queen Elizabeth building on the Exhibition Grounds immediately prior to race day and features over 60 vendors as well as the race kit pick-up for event participants.

COVID-19 
Due to the COVID-19 pandemic, the 2020 edition of the race was cancelled, while the 2021 edition of the race was virtualized, as organizers stated that COVID-19 vaccine distribution will not be wide enough by May 2021 in order to allow the live in-person racing event to be safely held by that spring.

Criticism 
In 2018 the Toronto Marathon was accused of having an incorrect distance. Participants using GPS's believed that the marathon course was 43km even though it was supposed to be 42.2km. The organizers claim that this is not true and that "the distance is 100 per cent correct"  The course was proven to be measured correctly and km points designated accurate. It is known that when using a GPS, the signal can be inaccurate, especially around tall structures like those found in the downtown core, and that it caused an inaccurate reading for some runners using this technology. The course is certified by AIMS and Athletics Canada meeting their measurement criteria and is re-surveyed every 5 to 10 years as required by these respective organizations.

List of Marathon winners

See also
 List of marathon races in North America

References

External links
 Official website

Marathons in Canada
Sports competitions in Toronto
Recurring sporting events established in 1995
Annual sporting events in Canada
Spring (season) events in Canada